Alla Efimova is an art historian, curator, and consultant based in Berkeley, CA. She grew up in St. Petersburg, Russia.

Efimova was the Director of the Magnes Collection of Jewish Art and Life at the University of California Berkeley (2009–14)  and a curator at the Berkeley Art Museum/Pacific Film Archive. She is the founder of KunstWorks, an agency specializing in legacy advancement for contemporary artists and artists' estates. She has taught modern and contemporary art history at the University of California Santa Cruz and San Francisco Art Institute.

Efimova serves on the boards of the Carl Heidenreich Foundation, Wild Projects, and on the advisory board of the American Photography Archives Group (APAG).

Education 
Alla Efimova received her B.A. from New York University, and a Ph.D. in Visual and Cultural Studies from the University of Rochester.

Exhibitions and publications

Selected exhibitions 
Through the Eyes of Rachel Marker: A Literary Installation by Moira Roth. The Magnes Collection, University of California Berkeley, 2013.
They Called Me Meyer July. The Magnes, Berkeley, 2007. Presented at The Jewish Museum (NY) and Jewish Historical Museum (Amsterdam).
Acting Out: Claude Cahun and Marcel Moore. With guest curator Tirza True Latimer. The Magnes, Berkeley, 2005. Presented at The Frye Art Museum, Seattle, WA.
Carl Heidenreich and Hans Hofmann in Post-War New York. Berkeley Art Museum/Pacific Film Archive, 2004.

Exhibition catalogues 
Surviving Suprematism: Lazar Khidekel. The Magnes, Berkeley, 2005.
Layers: Contemporary Collage from St. Petersburg, Russia. Center for Art, Design, and Visual Culture, UMBC, 1996.

Selected books 
Thought Experiments: The Art of Jonathon Keats. Alla Efimova and Julie Decker, eds. Hirmer Publishers, 2021.
The Jewish Worlds: 100 Treasures of Art and Culture from The Magnes Collection. Alla Efimova and Francesco Spagnolo. Skira Rizzoli, 2014.
Textura: Russian Essays on Visual Culture. Alla Efimova and Lev Manovich, eds. The University of Chicago Press, 1993.

Articles 
"On the Art of Jonathon Keats," Zyzzyva (April 2021)
"The Gifts," Brill (January 2007) 
"To Touch on the Raw: The Aesthetic Affections of Socialist Realism," Art Journal (May 2014) 
"On Sleep and Oblivion in Post-Soviet Film." In The Imprints of Terror : The Rhetoric of Violence and the Violence of Rhetoric in Modern Russian Culture, ed. Anna Brodsky, et al. (Wien: Sagner, 2006).

References

External links 

 Official website
 Video of San Francisco Arts Commission reading and conversation on Ed Aulerich-Sugai

Writers from Berkeley, California
Women art historians
American art historians
Russian art historians
Russian women historians
Historians of Russian art
American art curators
Russian art curators
New York University alumni
University of Rochester alumni
Writers from Saint Petersburg
Year of birth missing (living people)
Living people
Historians from California
Russian women curators